Dudu, a Human Destiny is a 1924 German silent film directed by Rudolf Meinert and starring Alfred Abel, Robert Garrison, and Maly Delschaft. It is part of the tradition of circus films.

The film's sets were designed by the art director Franz Seemann.

Cast
Alfred Abel
Robert Garrison
Maly Delschaft
Philipp Manning
Lotte Sachs
Max Schreck
Margot Morgan
Margarete Kupfer
Olga Limburg
Johanna Ewald
Leopold von Ledebur
Kurt Katch
Wilhelm Diegelmann
Emil Albes
Paul Henckels

References

External links

Films of the Weimar Republic
German silent feature films
Films directed by Rudolf Meinert
German black-and-white films
Circus films
1920s German films